Franz Spina (5 October 1868 in Markt Türnau, Austria-Hungary – 17 September 1938 in Prague, Czechoslovakia) was a German-Czechoslovakian right-wing and activist politician of the First Republic Era. Franz Spina was chairman of Bund der Landwirte, or Union of Farmers and Rural Enterprises, right-wing party of German-speaking countryside of Czechoslovakia. His party was the first to actively cooperate with Czechoslovak government and entered the Cabinet of Lord's Coalition (Prime Minister Antonín Švehla) together with Czechoslovak agrarians, clericals, entrepreneurs and national democrats. Franz Spina became the very first ethnic German government minister in Czechoslovakia. Since the establishment of Sudeten German Party, popularity of Union of Farmers had been declining. However, Spina believed in successful Czechoslovak-German cooperation until his death in 1938, fortnight before the Munich Agreement.

1868 births
1938 deaths
People from Svitavy District
People from the Margraviate of Moravia
Moravian-German people
Farmers' League politicians
Government ministers of Czechoslovakia
Members of the Chamber of Deputies of Czechoslovakia (1920–1925)
Members of the Chamber of Deputies of Czechoslovakia (1925–1929)
Members of the Chamber of Deputies of Czechoslovakia (1929–1935)
Members of the Chamber of Deputies of Czechoslovakia (1935–1939)
Sudeten German people